Richie Dixon (born c. 1947) is a former rugby union footballer, the former head coach of the Scotland national team, the Georgia national team and Glasgow Caledonians (now known as Glasgow Warriors). He was head of Physical Education at Currie High School in Edinburgh from 1972 until 1980.

Playing career

Amateur career

Born in Chirnside, Berwickshire, Dixon played for Jordanhill.

Provincial career

As a rugby player he was to captain Glasgow District; the side that was later to become the Glasgow Warriors on professionalism.

He started off playing on the Wing or Centre for Glasgow. Later in his career, he made the switch to Flanker and represented Glasgow there too. It was thought that this utility factor negatively influenced his chances of a senior Scotland cap.

The Glasgow Herald of 8 October 1974 commented:
Jordanhill's Richie Dixon began his second district career in that ill-starred Murrayfield inter-city. Having played 22 times for Glasgow on the Wing or Centre between 1967 and 1970, he switched to the pack and re-appeared in the district team as a flanker, but midway in the first half had to go back to full back. The national selectors were reminded that he used to be a back and that seems to have been holding back his career ever since.

International career

Dixon played for Scotland 'B' on 3 occasions and captained the side each time. He also played for the Barbarians.

He was on the bench for the Scotland side but never managed to get on the pitch to secure his full cap.

Coaching career

Glasgow District 

Dixon coached Glasgow District; notably during its famous unbeaten 1989-90 season, winning the Scottish Inter-District Championship outright and topped off with a 22–11 win against Fiji at Hughenden Stadium.

Scotland 

He coached the Scotland B national rugby union team for many years and was also involved in coaching the Sweden national rugby union team.

He was Scotland national rugby union team Head Coach from 1995 to 1998. As Scotland boss he took Scotland to within one game of a grand slam when they were beaten by England at Murrayfield in 1996. Dixon lost his job in 1998 after a defeat by Italy in the warm up to the Five Nations. His success rate in the role for competitive matches was 50% - just below Jim Telfer's 53.8% but ahead of Ian McGeechan's 42%.

International matches as head coach

London Scottish 

Dixon had a brief tenure at London Scottish.

Glasgow Warriors 

He took over the Glasgow club from New Zealander Keith Robertson in January 1999. As part of the coaching set-up Rob Moffat joined him as assistant coach.

During Dixon's tenure Glasgow Caledonians dropped its merged identity  and rebranded itself back to Glasgow Rugby in 2002.

Dixon was replaced as Warriors boss by New Zealander Kiwi Searancke on 27 June 2002. when he became the SRU's Head of Coach Development. He was to retain some input to the Warriors as he was to become official team manager offering advice to his successor. Glasgow's assistant Rob Moffat was to become Head Coach of the newly reformed Border Reivers.

Searancke's reign at Glasgow was short-lived as it was felt he was overly critical of the players. This meant Dixon had to step in as caretaker in April 2003 when the New Zealander left the club. The caretaker role only lasted a few weeks as the club quickly settled on Hugh Campbell as the new Glasgow Head Coach.

Border Reivers 

As well as Head of Coach Development, Dixon was made Assistant Coach at Border Reivers in 2006. However, financial troubles caused the Borders club to fold in 2007.

SRU 

Dixon held the SRU's coaching development role until 2009 when he fell victim to cost cutting.

Georgia 

In 2010 he was to become the national coach of the Georgian rugby team and coached them at the World Cup. He was awarded the country's Honorary Order of Excellence by the President for services to rugby in Georgia.

World Rugby 

In 2012 he became a project manager for World Rugby advising emergent countries. He has special remit for Georgia and Romania.

Honours

As a coach

  
 Five Nations Championship
 Runner-up: 1996
 Centenary Quaich
 Winner: 1996, 1997
 Glasgow Warriors 
 Scottish Inter-District Championship
 Winner: 1999-2000

References

External links
 Richie Dixon on Andy Nicol

1947 births
Living people
Barbarian F.C. players
Glasgow District (rugby union) players
Glasgow Warriors coaches
Jordanhill RFC players
Rugby union players from Scottish Borders
Scotland 'B' international rugby union players
Scotland national rugby union team coaches
Scottish rugby union coaches
Scottish rugby union players
Georgia national rugby union team coaches